Mária Augusztinovics (also Marija Augustinovič or Maria Augustinovics, 1930 – 21 November 2014) was a Hungarian macroeconomist known for her work in labour economics and on pension systems.

Augusztinovics graduated from the Karl Marx University of Economics in Budapest in 1952, defended her doctoral dissertation there in 1956, and completed a habilitation in 1980. In 1979, as Head of Department in the Hungarian National Planning Office, Augusztinovics was elected as a Fellow of the Econometric Society. She was also a consulting member of the Hungarian Academy of Sciences and an honorary professor at Corvinus University of Budapest.

References

1930 births
2014 deaths
Macroeconomists
Hungarian economists
Women economists
Fellows of the Econometric Society
Officer's Crosses of the Order of Merit of the Republic of Hungary (civil)